Keerti Nagpure is an Indian actress who primarily works in Hindi television. She made her acting debut in 2010 with Olakh portraying Vibhavari Talwarkar. Nagpure is best known for her portrayal of Siddhi Malik Chopra in Parichay and Nandini Pandey Raghuvanshi in Desh Ki Beti Nandini.

Since May 2022, Nagpure is seen portraying Tulsi Mohan Trivedi in Pyar Ka Pehla Naam: Radha Mohan.

Career

Debut, breakthrough and success (2010-2016)
Nagpure started her career with Star Pravah Talent Hunt Competition. She made her acting debut with the Marathi serial Olakh portraying Vibhavari "Vibha" Talwarkar from 2010 to 2011. 

She made her Hindi television debut with Parichay portraying Siddhi Malik Chopra opposite Samir Soni from 2011 to 2013. It proved as a major turning point in her career. She received nominations and recognition for her performance.

Nagpure made her film debut in 2012 with the Marathi film Zalay Dimag Kharab portraying the lead. From 2013 to 2014, she portrayed Nandini Pandey Raghuvanshi in Desh Ki Beti Nandini opposite Rafi Malik.

She then portrayed Priyanka Gobhandarkari in Beta Hi Chahiye in 2013, Geet Singh in Ek Veer Ki Ardaas...Veera in 2015 and Pranali in Naagarjuna – Ek Yoddha in 2016.

Further career and recent work (2017-present)
In 2017, she portrayed Vidya Purohit in Kuldeepak opposite Shardul Thakur. The same year, she made her web debut with Sony LIV's Shaurya portraying Vineeta Ashok Kamte opposite Raqesh Bapat.

From 2018 to 2019, she portrayed Drishti opposite Rahil Azam, Meena opposite Hasan Zaidi and Radha opposite Ankit Gupta in three different episodes of Laal Ishq. In 2021, she portrayed Tanu Prajapati in Mil Gayi Manzil Mujhe.

Since May 2022, she is seen portraying Tulsi Mohan Trivedi in Pyar Ka Pehla Naam: Radha Mohan.

Filmography

Television

Special appearances

Films

Web series

Awards and nominations

See also
 List of Indian television actresses

References

External links
 

Living people
Place of birth missing (living people)
Indian television actresses
1987 births
Actresses from Pune
21st-century Indian actresses
Actresses in Hindi television